1 Princes Dock (also known as Liverpool City Lofts) is a 22-storey residential complex located alongside Prince's Dock, in Liverpool, England. The building is home to 162 flats and 99 parking spaces. 1 Princes Dock was first proposed in 2003 and was quickly approved with construction commencing in the next year; the building was designed by AFL Architects and developed by City Lofts Group PLC. The main contractor was Carillion Construction.

Gallery

References 

Buildings and structures in Liverpool
Residential skyscrapers in England
Skyscrapers in Liverpool
Residential buildings completed in 2006
1 Princes Dock
Residential buildings in Liverpool